The Alfa Romeo Giulietta (Tipo 116, Italian for Type 116) is a small executive saloon car manufactured by Italian car maker Alfa Romeo from 1977 to 1985. The car was introduced in November 1977 and while it took its name from the original Giulietta of 1954 to 1965, it was a new design based on the Alfa Romeo Alfetta chassis (including its rear mounted transaxle). The Giulietta went through two facelifts, the first in 1981 and the second one in 1983. All Giuliettas used 5-speed manual transmissions.

While it was a conventional three-box saloon/sedan body style, a defining point of difference was at the rear, where there was a short boot, and a small aerodynamic spoiler, integrated into the body. The Giulietta was only offered in saloon form, but there were several estate/station wagon conversions made. First out was Moretti, whose conversion appeared in the first half of 1978.

History

First series

The Giulietta was launched in November 1977. Two models were available: Giulietta 1.3, with an oversquare  1357 cc engine, and Giulietta 1.6, with a  1570 cc engine, both Alfa Romeo Twin Cam inline-fours fed by two twin-choke carburettors.

In April 1979, just under two years later, Giulietta 1.8 with a  1779 cc engine was added, and in May of the following year the Giulietta Super with a 2-litre engine (1962 cc) appeared. The Giulietta was unusual in that the tachometer rotated counter-clockwise, meeting the speedometer needle at the top, rather than the usual clockwise movement.

Second series

In summer of 1981, the Giulietta received a minor facelift, externally and internally, while the engines remained the same. The car got plastic protection around the lower body, while interior modifications included a new steering wheel and new seats.  The instrument panel and the centre armrest were also modified.

The Autodelta-produced Giulietta 2.0 Turbo Autodelta (175 PS) was introduced at the 1982 Paris motor show. This special version had a turbocharged 1,962 cc engine. The production Giulietta Turbodelta version had  and a KKK turbocharger coupled with two double-barrel Weber carburettors. All turbo versions were black with red interior; only 361 were produced.

In 1982, Alfetta and Giulietta turbodiesels achieved seven world speed records over 5/10/25/50 thousand kilometres and 5/10/25 thousand miles at Nardò (Lecce). While one of the quickest diesels in its category at the time, the Giulietta was rather costly and suffered from a very forward weight distribution (56.9 per cent over the front wheels).

Third series
In late 1983, the "84" Giulietta (Series 3) was presented, with minor differences in appearance, bumpers were redesigned and the dashboard was significantly re-designed, the instruments changed slightly and the rear seat in some versions changed its form. Mechanically it was basically the same, with minor modifications to the brake booster and inlet manifold on some versions.

The largest external market for the Giulietta was South Africa, where a very successful TV advertising campaign by Alfa Romeo produced good sales between 1981 and 1984. Central to this campaign was emphasis of the Giulietta's new 'aerodynamic' line, which was carried over to the 75, and then the 33. The Giulietta was the 'last hurrah' for Alfa in South Africa before the appearance of the 164 and 156 models in the 1990s

In 1985, after around 380,000 Giuliettas had been built, it was replaced by the Alfa Romeo 75, which used much of the Alfetta/Giulietta underpinnings.

Engines

References

External links

Giulietta (1977)
Sedans
Rear-wheel-drive vehicles
1980s cars
Cars introduced in 1977